Filip Bradarić (born 11 January 1992) is a Croatian professional footballer who currently plays as a defensive midfielder for the Croatia national team.

Club career

Hajduk Split
Having passed through the ranks of the Hajduk Split youth academy, Bradarić was loaned in the summer of 2011 to the Treća HNL Jug side NK Primorac 1929 for two seasons, and there he was a first-team fixture both in the third and the second tier of Croatian football. In the summer of 2013, he joined Hajduk's first team under the coach Igor Tudor, making his Prva HNL debut on 13 July 2013, coming in the 73rd minute of his club's 5–1 away win vs. NK Zadar for Tonći Mujan.

Rijeka
On 3 February 2015 Bradarić signed a -year deal with HNK Rijeka. On 5 May 2017, HNK Rijeka and Bradarić agreed to a contract extension until June 2020.

Cagliari 
On 3 August 2018 he signed a five-year contract with Cagliari, thus beginning his first experience abroad. In the Sardinian team he joined his countrymen Darijo Srna and Marko Pajač.

International career
In November 2016, Bradarić received his first call-up to the senior Croatia squad for matches against Iceland and Northern Ireland. He made his debut in a friendly against Northern Ireland on 15 November 2016.

In May 2018, he was named in Croatia’s preliminary 32 man squad for the 2018 FIFA World Cup in Russia. On 4 June 2018, Bradarić was included in Croatia's final World Cup squad. On 26 June 2018, he came on as a substitute for Luka Modrić in the 65th minute of the 2018 FIFA World Cup match against Iceland, becoming the third player in HNK Rijeka's history to feature in the FIFA World Cup.

Career statistics

Club

International

Honours
HNK Rijeka
Prva HNL: 2016–17
Croatian Football Cup: 2016–17

Croatia
 FIFA World Cup runner-up: 2018

Orders
 Order of Duke Branimir: 2018

References

External links

Filip Bradarić profile  at nk-rijeka.hr

1992 births
Living people
Footballers from Split, Croatia
Croatian footballers
Association football midfielders
HNK Hajduk Split players
NK Primorac 1929 players
HNK Rijeka players
Cagliari Calcio players
RC Celta de Vigo players
Al-Ain FC (Saudi Arabia) players
Al-Ahli Saudi FC players
First Football League (Croatia) players
Croatian Football League players
Serie A players
La Liga players
Saudi Professional League players
Croatia youth international footballers
Croatia under-21 international footballers
Croatia international footballers
2018 FIFA World Cup players
Croatian expatriate footballers
Expatriate footballers in Italy
Expatriate footballers in Saudi Arabia
Expatriate footballers in Spain
Croatian expatriate sportspeople in Italy
Croatian expatriate sportspeople in Saudi Arabia
Croatian expatriate sportspeople in Spain